Kiamoy (also spelled kiamuy or kiam muy, or in Philippine Spanish as ciamoy), is a class of Filipino treats made with dried sour plums, prunes, or apricots preserved in brine and vinegar. They are sold covered in a powdery coating of an anise (sometimes licorice), li hing (red powder made from plum seeds), salt, and sugar mixture called "kiamoy powder" or kiam-muy-hoon. They are characteristically bright red, orange, or light brown in color. They originate from Chinese Filipino immigrants and are derived from the li hing mui (旅行梅) treats of Chinese cuisine (also called huamei, 話梅). The name is derived from Philippine Hokkien . 

A local variant of the kiamoy that evolved in the Bicol Region of the Philippines is champóy (also spelled tsampóy, sampóy, or cham-poi, names which can also apply to kiamoy). It differs from kiamoy in that champóy is made from the locally available berry Myrica rubra (which is also known as "champóy"). Champóy is also dark red to black in color and has a predominantly sweet and tart flavor profile, in contrast to the saltier flavor profile of kiamoy. In modern times, the term "champóy" has also come to include the similar-tasting sampalok candy (sometimes differentiated as champóy na sampalok), which are sweets made from tamarind balls cooked in sugar and/or salt. Champoy is derived from Cantonese , referring to chenpi.

Kiamoy are popular as street food usually sold near schools and are also commonly eaten as a remedy for car sickness. Kiamoy can also be infused into alcoholic drinks. Kiamoy powder is also sold separately as an ingredient, and can be used as a coating for kiamoy chicken or as a dip for fruits like pomelo, fresh green mango, or pickled green mango.

Kiamoy and champóy are believed to be the direct ancestors of the Mexican treat saladitos and the chamoy sauce derived from it. They were transported to Nueva España by Filipino migrants via the Manila Galleons (1565 to 1815).

See also
Chamoy
Chanh muối
Crack seed
Pickled fruit
Umeboshi
Burong mangga
Atchara
List of pickled foods

References

Candy
Philippine desserts
Vegetarian dishes of the Philippines
Food preservation
Philippine fusion cuisine